Robert Smith (June 12, 1802 – December 21, 1867) was a U.S. Representative from Illinois, nephew of Jeremiah Smith and Samuel Smith of New Hampshire. Smith founded General Mills in 1856.

Born in Peterborough, New Hampshire, Smith attended the public schools and New Ipswich Academy. He taught school. He engaged in mercantile pursuits in 1822 and in the manufacturing of textile goods in Northfield, New Hampshire in 1823. He studied law. He was admitted to the bar and practiced. He moved to Illinois and settled in Alton in 1832 and again engaged in mercantile pursuits.

Smith was elected captain in the state militia in 1832. He was an extensive land owner, and engaged in the real estate business. He served as a member of the Illinois House of Representatives from 1836-1840. He was elected enrolling and engrossing clerk of the Illinois House of Representatives in 1840 and 1842.

Smith was elected as a Democrat to the Twenty-eighth and Twenty-ninth Congresses and reelected as an Independent Democrat to the Thirtieth Congress (March 4, 1843 – March 3, 1849). He served as chairman of the Committee on Roads and Canals (Twenty-ninth Congress).

Smith was elected as a Democrat to the Thirty-fifth Congress (March 4, 1857 – March 3, 1859). He served as chairman of the Committee on Mileage (Thirty-fifth Congress). He served as paymaster during the Civil War. He died in Alton, and was interred in Alton City Cemetery.

Smith attended an event in Greenville, Illinois in 1858 in which Abraham Lincoln and Stephen Douglas gave speeches around the time of the Lincoln-Douglas debates.

References

1802 births
1867 deaths
People from Peterborough, New Hampshire
Members of the Illinois House of Representatives
People from Alton, Illinois
American militia officers
Illinois Independents
Democratic Party members of the United States House of Representatives from Illinois
Independent Democrat members of the United States House of Representatives
19th-century American politicians
Military personnel from Illinois